Integrity is a hardcore punk band originally from Cleveland, Ohio but based in Belgium since 2003. It was formed in 1988 by lead vocalist Dwid Hellion.

The band plays punk, hardcore, and metal-related music, and has released nearly 50 recordings since 1988 as well as playing at hundreds of shows including numerous global festival appearances. Their sound is a mix of noise, punk, blues, hardcore and heavy metal, with influences including industrial, noise and experimental music. Lyrical themes include religion, the supernatural, art, philosophy, horror, as well as mental illness and the occult.

Musical style and legacy 
According to its bio on Relapse Records website, Integrity was formed in Cleveland in 1988 and is considered to be one of the first bands to mix metal and hardcore in a way that would later become popular. 

They have cited influences including Celtic Frost, Septic Death, Black Sabbath, Samhain, Metallica, Joy Division, Bauhaus  and Throbbing Gristle.

Hellion has also had numerous side projects, including his electronic project, Psywarfare and horror-themed, Vermapyre. He has also worked with the band Enforced.

In July 2017, Hellion was featured on the cover of Decibel magazine, No. 153. He is quoted as saying "I do not listen to much new music. When I need a new album to listen to, I make one." Previously, in 2013, Integrity's Systems Overload (1995, Victory Records) was featured in the Decibel "Hall of Fame". In feature, the album is referred to as "the landmark work in a grand and heretical oeuvre".

Members 
 Current members
 Dwid Hellion – vocals, keyboards (1988–present)
 Domenic Romeo – guitar, bass, organ (2014–present)

 Touring members
 Alex "The Beast" Henderson – drums (2011–present)
 Francis "Darkest Prince" Kano – bass (2017–present)
 Justin "Sexminn" Ethem – guitar (2018–present)

 Former members

 Aaron Melnick – guitar, vocals (1988–1998)
 Tom Front – bass (1988–1989)
 Tiny Pines – drums (1988–1991)
 Leon "Micha" Melnick – bass (1989–1998)
 Frank Cavanaugh – guitar (1991)
 Bill Mckinney – guitar (1991)
 Chris Smith (II) – guitar (1991–1994)
 David Nicholi Araca – drums (1991–1994)
 Frank "3 Gun" Novineck – guitar (1994–1998)
 Chris Dora – drums (1996–1998)
 Dave "Gravy" Felton – guitar (1998–2000)
 Steve Felton – drums (1998–2000)
 Craig Martini – bass (1998–2000)
 Vee Price – guitar, bass, vocals (2000–2002)
 John Comprix – guitar (2003)
 Blaze Tishko – guitar, vocals (2003)
 Steve Rauckhorst – bass (2003–2009)
 Matt Brewer – guitar (2005–2006)
 Mike Jochum – guitar (2003–2009)
 Nate Jochum – drums (2005–2009)
 Rob Orr – guitar, bass, drums (2006–2014)

Discography 

Source:
 Those Who Fear Tomorrow (1991, Overkill)
 Den of Iniquity (EP) (1993)
 Hooked, Lung, Stolen Breath Cunt (EP) (1994)
 Systems Overload (1995, Victory)
 Humanity is the Devil (1996, Victory)
 Seasons in the Size of Days (1997, Victory)
 Integrity 2000 (1999, Victory)
 Final Taste of Every Sin (EP) (1999)
 Closure (2001, Victory)
 In Contrast of Tomorrow (EP) (2001, 2006)
 To Die For (2003, Deathwish)
 Palm Sunday (live album) (2006, Aurora Borealis)
 The Blackest Curse (2010, Deathwish)
 Suicide Black Snake (2013, A389/Magic Bullet)
 Howling, For the Nightmare Shall Consume (2017, Relapse Records)

References

External links

 Integrity on Bandcamp

Metalcore musical groups from Ohio
Musical groups from Cleveland
Musical groups established in 1988
Deathwish Inc. artists
American musical duos
Victory Records artists
Good Life Recordings artists